Jefferson Township is one of the fifteen townships of Adams County, Ohio, United States.  As of the 2010 census the population was 1,046.

Geography
Located in the eastern part of the county, it borders the following townships:
Meigs Township - north
Brush Creek Township, Scioto County - northeast
Nile Township, Scioto County - southeast
Green Township - south
Brush Creek Township - west

No municipalities are located in Jefferson Township, although the unincorporated community of Blue Creek lies in the township's west.

History
Jefferson Township was organized in 1806. It is named for Thomas Jefferson.

It is one of twenty-four Jefferson Townships statewide.

Government
The township is governed by a three-member board of trustees, who are elected in November of odd-numbered years to a four-year term beginning on the following January 1. Two are elected in the year after the presidential election and one is elected in the year before it. There is also an elected township fiscal officer, who serves a four-year term beginning on April 1 of the year after the election, which is held in November of the year before the presidential election. Vacancies in the fiscal officership or on the board of trustees are filled by the remaining trustees.

Notable people
Lloyd Estel Copas, American country music singer, better known by his stage name, Cowboy Copas

References

External links
County website

Townships in Adams County, Ohio
1806 establishments in Ohio
Townships in Ohio